Class 2000 may refer to:

Bangladesh Railway Class 2000
CFL Class 2000
LRTA Class 2000
Midland Railway 2000 Class
2000 class railcar in Adelaide, South Australia